Richard "Rick" Thompson (born October 2, 1952) is a former Democratic member of the West Virginia House of Delegates, representing the 17th District since 2000. He served as Speaker of the House from January 2007 to June 2013. He earlier served as a Delegate from 1981 through 1983. He unsuccessfully ran for Governor of West Virginia in 2011, coming in second place behind acting Governor Earl Ray Tomblin. Thompson resigned from the House of Delegates in June 2013 after being appointed by Tomblin to serve as West Virginia Secretary of Veterans Assistance. Resigned as Assistant Secretary of Veteran Affairs to Run for Wayne County Sheriff. Currently serving as Sherriff of Wayne County.

Thompson holds degrees from Marshall University and West Virginia University College of Law.

References

External links
West Virginia Legislature - Delegate Richard Thompson,  Speaker biography official government websites
 Rick Thompson for West Virginia official campaign site
Project Vote Smart - Representative Richard Thompson (WV) profile
Follow the Money - Richard Thompson
2008 2006 2004 2002 2000 campaign contributions
 

1952 births
Living people
Marshall University alumni
People from Louisa, Kentucky
People from Wayne County, West Virginia
Speakers of the West Virginia House of Delegates
Democratic Party members of the West Virginia House of Delegates
West Virginia lawyers
West Virginia University College of Law alumni
21st-century American politicians